Robert Carter Ruddick (September 1, 1861 – 1921) was a Canadian politician. He served in the Legislative Assembly of New Brunswick from 1902 to 1907 as an Independent member.

References 

1861 births
1929 deaths